Axel Krämer (born 16 July 1957) is a German sports shooter. He competed in the mixed skeet event at the 1980 Summer Olympics.

References

External links
 

1957 births
Living people
German male sport shooters
Olympic shooters of East Germany
Shooters at the 1980 Summer Olympics
People from Thale
Sportspeople from Saxony-Anhalt